"Starting Over" is the second single by American metalcore band Killswitch Engage from their fifth album Killswitch Engage.  The song's promotional video is directed by frequent collaborator Lex Halaby.

Track listing

Chart positions

References

2009 singles
Killswitch Engage songs
Roadrunner Records singles
2009 songs
Song recordings produced by Brendan O'Brien (record producer)